Susan Adele Greenfield, Baroness Greenfield,  (born 1 October 1950) is an English scientist, writer, broadcaster and member of the House of Lords (since 2001). Her research has focused on the treatment of Parkinson's disease and Alzheimer's disease. She is also interested in the neuroscience of consciousness and the impact of technology on the brain.

Greenfield is a senior research fellow at Lincoln College, Oxford; she was a professor of Synaptic Pharmacology.

Greenfield was chancellor of Heriot-Watt University in Edinburgh between 2005 and 2013. From 1998 to 2010, she was director of the Royal Institution of Great Britain. In September 2013, she co-founded the biotech company Neuro-bio Ltd, where she is chief executive officer.

Education
Greenfield's mother, Doris (née Thorp), was a dancer and a Christian, and her father, Reginald Myer Greenfield, was an electrician who was the son of a first-generation Yiddish-speaking Jewish immigrant from Austria; her grandmothers never spoke and she said of them, "the prejudice was equally vociferous on both sides".

She attended the Godolphin and Latymer School, where she took A levels in Latin, Greek and ancient history, and maths. The first member of her immediate family to go to university, she was initially admitted to St Hilda's College to read Philosophy and Psychology, but changed course and graduated with a first-class degree in experimental psychology. As a Senior Scholar at St Hugh's College, Oxford, she completed her DPhil degree in 1977 under the supervision of Anthony David Smith on the Origins of acetylcholinesterase in cerebrospinal fluid.

She then held a junior research fellowship at Green College, Oxford between 1981 and 1984.

Career

Greenfield's research is focused on brain physiology, particularly on the brain mechanisms of Parkinson's and Alzheimer's diseases. She is also known for her role in popularising science. Greenfield has written several books about the brain, regularly gives public lectures, and appears on radio and television.

Since 1976, Greenfield has published approximately 200 papers in peer-reviewed journals, including studies on brain mechanisms involved in addiction and reward, relating to dopamine systems and other neurochemicals. She investigated the brain mechanisms underlying attention deficit hyperactivity disorder (ADHD) as well as the impact of environmental enrichment.

In 1994, she was the first woman to give the Royal Institution Christmas Lectures, then sponsored by the BBC. Her lectures were titled "Journey to the centre of the brain". She was appointed Director of the Royal Institution in 1998. The post was abolished in 2010. The Royal Institution had found itself in a financial crisis following a £22m development programme led by Greenfield and the Board. The project ended £3 million in debt. Greenfield subsequently announced that she would be taking her employers to an employment tribunal and her claim would include discrimination. The case was settled out of court.

Greenfield's two main positions at Oxford were Tutorial Fellow in Medicine at Lincoln College Oxford, and Professor of Synaptic Pharmacology. Between 1995 and 1999, she gave public lectures as Gresham Professor of Physic in London. Greenfield was Adelaide's Thinker in Residence for 2004 and 2005.

As a result of her recommendations, South Australian Premier Mike Rann made a major funding commitment, backed by the State and Federal Governments and the private sector, to establish the Royal Institution of Australia and the Australian Science Media Centre in Adelaide.

She has explored the relevance of neuroscience knowledge to education and has used the phrase "mind change", an umbrella term comparable to "climate change", encompassing diverse issues involved in the impact of the 21st-century environment on the brain.

In 2013 she co-founded the biotech company Neuro-bio Ltd which develops diagnostic tests and therapeutics for Alzheimer's disease. The company has found that the C terminus of acetylcholinesterase can be cleaved and that the resulting peptide can kill neurons; the company has also found that a cyclic peptide analogue could prevent that neuronal death. The company raised around $4 million in 2017.

Politics

Greenfield sits in the Parliament of the United Kingdom in the House of Lords as a crossbencher, having no formal political affiliation. Records of Greenfield's activity in the House of Lords indicate abstention on a range of issues. She has spoken on a variety of topics, including education, drugs, and economic empowerment for women.

Books

In 2013, Greenfield published a dystopian science-fiction novel, 2121: A Tale from the Next Century, telling the story of videogame-playing hedonists and their conflict with "Neo-Puritans".

In 2014, Greenfield published a popular science book called Mind Change: How Digital Technologies are Leaving their Mark on our Brains, describing her ideas about the impact of digital technology.

Impact of digital technology controversy

Greenfield has expressed concerns that internet usage may modify the brain structures of youngsters.

She noted that Public Health England had related social networking and multiplayer online games to "lower levels of wellbeing", and believed that evidence pointed to a "dose response" relationship, "where each additional hour of viewing increases the likelihood of experiencing socio-emotional problems". She believed this raised questions about where to draw the boundaries between beneficial and harmful use of such technology, saying that "it would be surprising if many hours per day of screen activity did not influence this neuroplasticity".

Honours
As of 2016, Greenfield has 32 honorary degrees; has received awards including the Royal Society's Michael Faraday Prize. She has been elected to an Honorary Fellowship of the Royal College of Physicians and the London Science Museum.

In 2006 she was made an Honorary Fellow of the British Science Association and was the Honorary Australian of the Year.

In January 2000, Greenfield received a CBE for her contribution to the public understanding of science. Later that year, she was named Woman of the Year by The Observer. In 2001, she became a Life Peer under the House of Lords Appointments Commission system, as Baroness Greenfield, of Ot Moor, Oxfordshire. Like the other people's peers she was self-nominated.

In 2003, she was appointed a Knight of the Legion of Honour by the French Government. In 2010 she was awarded the Australian Society for Medical Research Medal. She received the British Inspiration award for Science and Technology in 2010.

Patronage
She is a patron of Alzheimer's Research UK and of Dignity in Dying. She is a founder and trustee of the charity Science for Humanity, a network of scientists, researchers and technologists that collaborates with not-for-profit organisations to create practical solutions to the everyday problems of developing communities.

Personal life
Greenfield was married to the University of Oxford Professor Peter Atkins from 1991 until their divorce in 2005.

Bibliography

References

Further reading
Screen culture may be changing our brains Australian Broadcasting Corporation: The 7.30 Report, 19 March 2009.
'Stumbling into a Powerful Technology' (Address to the House of Lords), 20 April 2006.

External links

 
 

1950 births
20th-century British biologists
20th-century British women scientists
21st-century British biologists
21st-century British women scientists
Academics of Heriot-Watt University
Alumni of St Hilda's College, Oxford
Alzheimer's disease researchers
British women biologists
Chevaliers of the Légion d'honneur
Commanders of the Order of the British Empire
Crossbench life peers
Directors of the Royal Institution
English people of Austrian-Jewish descent
Fellows of Green College, Oxford
Fellows of Lincoln College, Oxford
Fellows of the Royal College of Physicians
Life peeresses created by Elizabeth II
Fullerian Professors of Physiology
Recipients of the Legion of Honour
Living people
Jewish Austrian writers
Jewish scientists
Jewish women scientists
Jewish women writers
Jewish British politicians
Jewish women politicians
Parkinson's disease researchers
People educated at Godolphin and Latymer School
People's peers
People from Chiswick
Professors of Gresham College
British neuroscientists
British women neuroscientists
20th-century English women writers
21st-century English women writers
Presidents of the Classical Association